Eagle Cap ( is a mountain peak located in the Wallowa Mountains, Wallowa–Whitman National Forest, in the U.S. state of Oregon. The peak is in the Eagle Cap Wilderness and the Benson Glacier is along the east flank of the summit ridge. Its summit is the highest point in Union County

References

Gallery

External links 
 

Mountains of Oregon
Landforms of Wallowa County, Oregon